Gunji is a small village in Uttarakhand of India. It is administered by India, but disputed by Nepal.  It is near the borders of Tibet and Nepal and the confluence of the Kuthi Yankti and Kalapani River, at the east end of the Kuthi Valley. It is officially listed in the map of India. Nepal has historically no significance over this place. As of now Gunji, Kuti, and Nabhi villages belong to India.  The village is on the traditional Indian/Nepalese route to Kailas–Manasarovar.

Demographics 
As per the 2011 census, the village of Gunji has a population of 335 people living in 194 households.

The village is only populated seasonally, with winters coming people migrate to lower places (mostly to Dharchula, in the same district).

Sashastra Seema Bal, the Indo-Tibet Border Police and GREF personnel remain there throughout the year.

Transportation 
It is possible to reach Gunji by helicopter, which takes off from Darchula.

While approaching Gunji from Dharcula and the rest of India, the route along the western bank of Sharda River (also called Mahakali River) at Gunji forks into two separate motorable routes, one goes north to Om Parvat and Kailash Mansarovar and another to the west to Adi Kailash. In May 2020, India inaugurated a new 80 km long road from Dharchula via Gunji to Lipulekh Pass on India-China border (under geostrategic India-China Border Roads project) to the Kailas-Manasarovar. In July 2020, India also opened a newly constructed road in this area from Gunji to Limpiyadhura Pass (Lampiya Dhura Pass on India-China border) which will reduce the trek time to Adi Kailash to two hours.

Trekkers and other travelers may get food and accommodation here, but in order to reach Gunji one has to obtain an Inner line permit which is issued by SDM  at Darchula. Travelers need a valid ID, a health certificate, and a character certificate at hand for this permit.

References

Populated places in Darchula District